Leeper is a census-designated place (CDP) located in Farmington Township, Clarion County, in the U.S. state of Pennsylvania. The community is located at the intersections of Pennsylvania Routes 66 and 36 in northern Clarion County. As of the 2010 census the population was 158.

Demographics

Notable person
Gene Host, baseball player.

References

External links

Census-designated places in Clarion County, Pennsylvania